Vedder Vedder Bedwetter is the third studio album by To Live and Shave in L.A., released on May 16, 1995 by Fifth Colvmn Records. It is recognized by critics as a particularly "harsh" entry in the noise music genre.

Music
Vocalist Tom Smith spent the free time he had during the recording sessions of 30-minuten männercreme to mix the album, while Frank Falestra continued to record his own parts for their debut. The album included sessions taped with Don Fleming at Waterworks in NYC, radio and live performances recording during the band's 1996 tour that featured accompaniment by Weasel Walter and Nándor Névai and their own live performances without collaborators. Smith attributes being inexperienced as a recording technician and said:

Release and reception 
Sonic Boom was thoroughly negative towards the band and their music, saying "the feedback coupled with the screaming vocals of which not a single intelligible word can be understood lacks any enticement that would allow for the establishment of a fan base." Despite reserved expectations, Jeff Bagato at Washington City Paper mostly enjoyed the album while noting the "impenetrable" nature of the music's noise genre.

Composers Frank Falestra and Tom Smith share opposing views of the album, with Falestra holding that it represents a strong point in the band's career while Smith describes it as "oafish bluster" and considers it the band's worst work. Writer Andrew Earles accused the work of not being "biting" or modern despite the intention to illustrate such in artist's name and album titles.  The Flying Luttenbachers bandleader Weasel Walter, guitar, tenor saxophone, trombone, has also expressed his dissatisfaction with the end result.

Track listing

Personnel 
Adapted from the Vedder Vedder Bedwetter liner notes.

To Live and Shave in L.A.
 Frank Falestra (as Rat Bastard) – bass guitar, engineering (1-5, 7, 9, 10, 12, 13, 15, 17, 18, 20, 23, 24, 26, 27, 29, 30, 33)
 Bill Orcutt – guitar (1, 3, 4, 9, 12, 17, 23, 26, 29)
 Tom Smith – lead vocals, electronics, production, recording and engineering (1-5, 7, 9, 10, 12, 13, 15, 17, 18, 20, 23, 24, 26, 27, 29, 30, 33)

Additional performers
 Don Fleming – guitar and backing vocals (22)
 Ned Hayden – alto saxophone (11)
 Jared Hendrickson – guitar (6, 11, 14, 19, 25, 28, 31, 32), backing vocals (19)
 Nándor Névai – trombone (8), guitar (10)
 Weasel Walter – guitar (4, 6, 7, 10), tenor saxophone (8, 34), trombone (34)
 Ben Wolcott – effects

Production and design
 Greg Chapman – liner notes
 Zalman Fishman – executive-production
 Syd – illustrations
 Greg Talenfeld – engineering, recording and mixing (6, 11, 14, 16, 19, 22, 25, 28, 31)

Release history

References

External links 
 Vedder Vedder Bedwetter at Bandcamp
 Vedder Vedder Bedwetter at Discogs (list of releases)

1995 albums
To Live and Shave in L.A. albums
Fifth Colvmn Records albums